All India Institute of Medical Sciences Raipur (AIIMS Raipur) is a medical college and medical research public university located in Raipur, Chhattisgarh, India. It is one of the six AIIMS healthcare established in 2012, and it operates autonomously under the Ministry of Health and family welfare (India), Government of India under the Pradhan Mantri Swasthya Suraksha Yojna (PMSSY).

History 
It was established in 2012. The total campus accounts for an area of about 100 acres on the outskirts of the city. Being geographically located in the centre of India, it lodges students from all over the country, particularly states like Kerala, Rajasthan, Maharashtra, Andhra Pradesh, Telangana, Madhya Pradesh, Uttar Pradesh, Haryana, Chhattisgarh, etc.

All-India Institute of Medical Sciences Amendment Act, 2012 replaced the Ordinance which allowed the six AIIMS—like institutes to become operational from September 2012. The All-India Institute of Medical Sciences (Amendment) Bill, 2012, was introduced in the Lok Sabha on 27 August 2012. Lok Sabha passed the AIIMS (Amendment) Bill, 2012 on 30 August 2012. Bill was then introduced in Rajya Sabha on 3 September 2012. Rajya Sabha passed the Bill on 4 September 2012. Bill got its assent from the President of India, Pranab Mukherjee on 12 September 2012 and the Act came into force. The proposed measure will help the Centre change the status of the six new AIIMS registered under the Indian Societies Registration Act to be autonomous body corporate on the lines of the existing AIIMS in Delhi.

Campus
AIIMS Raipur is located on GE Road, near the Tatibandh Gurudwara in Raipur.

Being located in an easily accessible location in the major city of Raipur, the institute answers to the medical needs of a majority of the population of Central India including Chhattisgarh, parts of eastern Maharashtra (Vidarbha Region), Madhya Pradesh and Odisha. The college is 26 kilometers from Swami Vivekananda Airport and 10.6 kilometers from Raipur Junction railway station.

Its campus houses several hospitals and institutions in addition to Medical College Hospital (MCH), including the College of Nursing, Dental College, State Virology Lab, etc.

Academics

Admission 
Admissions to the college for MBBS course are carried out through NEET-UG. 100 students are admitted to the course each year. Currently, departments for all postgraduate subjects are functional, and many super speciality departments have also begun training. The institute also offers undergraduate courses for Nursing and Paramedical.

The institute admitted its first batch of 50 MBBS students in September 2012. Since 2013, it admits 100 MBBS students per year. Currently, from 2020 onwards, it admits 125 MBBS students per year.

Academic programmes 
The institute provides the courses on :
 Undergraduate Education
 Postgraduate Education
 Doctoral Courses
 Nursing Education
 Dental Education

Glimpses of AIIMS Raipur

See also
 All India Institute of Medical Sciences
 Education in India
 List of medical colleges in India

References

External links
 

2012 establishments in Chhattisgarh
Educational institutions established in 2012
Education in Raipur, Chhattisgarh
Raipur
Medical colleges in Chhattisgarh